Nogometni klub Istra 1961, commonly referred to as NK Istra 1961, or simply Istra 1961 or Istra, is a Croatian professional football club from Pula, currently playing in the Croatian First League.

It is a common opinion amongst many people that Istra 1961 was founded in 1961 by merging two clubs from Pula, NK Uljanik and NK Pula, forming NK Istra. However, NK Istra is not the same club as NK Istra 1961. NK Istra 1961, then named NK Uljanik, was founded in 1964. NK Istra were competing in Prva HNL since the first season, but were relegated in the 1996–97 season to Druga HNL. They were promoted back to Prva HNL in the 1998–99 season, but they were relegated again in the next season, never coming back to Prva HNL. Meanwhile, NK Uljanik was in the shadow of NK Istra, but they were promoted to Prva HNL in the 2003–04 season and are the best club in Pula since then. NK Istra, now under the name NK Istra Pula, is competing in Prva ŽNL, the fifth football level in Croatia. The greatest club success was in the 2002–03 season when they finished runners-up in the Croatian Cup, losing to Hajduk Split 5–0 on aggregate.

In the 2004–05 season, the club changed its name into NK Pula 1856, because 1856 was the year that the Austro-Hungarian Empire made Pula the port of its arsenal and the shipyard Uljanik was opened. Also in the same year, it competed in the Prva HNL for the first time. In 2005, it was renamed again to NK Pula Staro Češko due to a sponsorship contract with the brewery Daruvarska pivovara (Staro Češko is a beer brand). Just one year later, the name was once again changed, this time to NK Pula. Again, just a year later in the middle of 2007, the name was changed for the fifth time in as many years, to NK Istra 1961. The change of name came after an ultimatum from the local fans Demoni who said the club would have their support only if the club changed its name and club colours to the traditional city colours (yellow and green). After renaming club was sold in 2011 to a Russian who achieved promotion for the club and sold it in 2015. NK Istra 1961 was bought by an American investment group in 2015. The NK Istra academy system consistently competes for top spots in the rankings.

Nk Istra 1961 has a rich fan history. The group of die hard fans are referred to as the Demoni, and are known for their explosive chants and celebrations as well as their extreme pride for the club. In summer 2018, club's ownership changed once again, this time to Basque consortium Baskonia - Alavés Group which acquired the majority share package and became sole owner of NK Istra 1961.

Its crest features the city's Roman arena in Pula, as well as the old team crest. Istra 1961 play their home matches at the recently renovated Stadion Aldo Drosina, which has a capacity of approximately 10,000 spectators.

History 
The first incarnation of NK Istra was NK Uljanik, a club founded by the Pula shipyard Uljanik in 1948. The first club success was in 1959–60 when they qualified to the Yugoslav Second League. In 1961 NK Uljanik merged with NK Pula to form NK Istra 1961. The club stopped functioning shortly thereafter, but was restarted by Silvan Farangua and Ivan Čehić in 1964, when they played in the Pula county league.

After the founding of an independent Croatia, the club played in the Druga HNL between 1993 and 1998, when they dropped down to Treća HNL. In 2001 they became the champions of Treća HNL and returned to Druga HNL.

Two years later in the 2002–03 season, under the leadership of manager Elvis Scoria, Istra played in the final of the Croatian Cup, losing to Hajduk Split. It is the only time, in the history of Croatian football, that a Druga HNL league club played in the cup final.

In season 2003–04 the club was managed by Igor Pamić. He managed to win the Druga HNL South, and beat Međimurje (0–2, 2–0) in the play-offs, after penalties.

The club played first league football for the first time in their history in the 2004–05 season, and managed their first Prva HNL win against Osijek in the fourth gameweek. The club lost only one game at home, but failed to win a single away game. They finished tenth, and won the play-offs to remain in the first league.

In 2005–06 the club president Gianni Rossando was replaced by Orsat Zovko. After a bad season start manager Pamić was replaced by Milivoj Bračun. The new manager managed a streak of good results. In the second half of the season Bračun resigned from the managerial position and was succeeded by Krunoslav Jurčić. The club finished in the season in seventh place.

During the summer manager Jurčić was fired, and replaced by Stjepan Deverić. Unstatisfied with the board, Deverić left before the start of the season. Branko Tucak became the new manager. After a string of bad results and clashed with the players, he was replaced by Krunoslav Jurčić. Bad results, compounded with a poor financial situation threatened the club with shutdown. The intervention of the Istria govurner and arrival of new sponsors managed to save the club, while the new president became Darko Jergović.

Pula finished the 2006–07 season in eleventh place, and lost the play-offs to Zadar (3–0, 2–3). They would then return to the Druga HNL.

Valdi Šumberac was appointed as the first manager. During this time, Istra was adopted by Demoni, who became the club's first group of ultras. At the end of August 2007 the club appointed Elvis Scoria as the new manager, while Šumberac remained as an assistant manager. Istra finished the season in the third place. However, the club finished the 2008–09 season as the champions of the Druga HNL and were promoted to the Prva HNL.

NK Istra achieved their best domestic success in the 2013–14 season, when they reached the semifinal of the Croatian Cup.

In June 2018, NK Istra was bought by the Baskonia-Alaves Group, who acquired the majority stake in the club, buying a total of 85% of the shares.

On 14 April 2021, Istra 1961 repeated the success of the 2013–14 season, qualifying for the final of the Croatian Cup, with a 3–2 home victory over Rijeka in the semifinal. They fell 6-3 to Dinamo Zagreb in the final.

Recent seasons

Key 

Top scorer shown in bold when he was also top scorer for the division.

P = Played
W = Games won
D = Games drawn
L = Games lost
F = Goals for
A = Goals against
Pts = Points
Pos = Final position

1. HNL = Prva HNL
2. HNL = Druga HNL
3. HNL = Treća HNL

PR = Preliminary round
R1 = Round 1
R2 = Round 2
QF = Quarter-finals
SF = Semi-finals
RU = Runners-up
W  = Winners

Current squad

Dual registration

Out on loan

Records 
The following are lists of top players in terms of number of appearances and goals for Istra 1961 in the Croatian First Football League, as of 22 May 2022.

Bold denotes players still playing for Istra 1961.

Kit manufacturers and shirt sponsors

Honours 
Croatian Second Football League
Winners (2): 2003–04, 2008–09
Croatian Third Football League
Winners (1): 2000–01
Croatian Cup
Runners-up: 2002–03, 2020–21
Semi-finals: 2013–14

Head coaches 

 Igor Pamić (2004–2005)
 Milivoj Bračun (2005–2006)
 Krunoslav Jurčić (2006–2007)
 Nenad Gračan (2007)
 Elvis Scoria (30 October 2007 – 2 November 2009)
 Valdi Šumberac (2 November 2009 – 27 February 2010)
 Zoran Vulić (28 February 2010 – 22 May 2010)
 Ante Miše (22 May 2010 – 2 August 2010)
 Robert Jarni (4 August 2010 – 19 September 2010)
 Davor Lasić (interim) (19 September 2010 – 5 October 2010)
 Zoran Vulić (6 October 2010 – 21 March 2011)
 Igor Pamić (29 March 2011 – 5 October 2015)
 Robert Rubčić (interim) (5 October 2015 – January 2016) 
 Andrej Panadić (January 2016 – 18 July 2016)
 Goran Tomić (26 July 2016 – 1 December 2016)
 Darko Raić-Sudar (interim) (1 December 2016 – 30 December 2016) 
 Marijo Tot (30 December 2016 – 19 May 2017)
 Darko Raić-Sudar (interim) (19 May 2017 – 31 May 2017)
 Darko Raić-Sudar (1 June 2017 – 1 June 2018)
 Manolo Márquez (1 June 2018 – 18 September 2018)
 Curro Torres (19 September 2018 – 27 October 2018)
 Krunoslav Rendulić (28 October 2018 – 4 March 2019)
 Igor Cvitanović (4 March 2019 – 10 June 2019)
 Ivan Prelec (15 June 2019 – 24 August 2020)
 Fausto Budicin (26 August 2020 – 12 February 2021)
 Danijel Jumić (12 February 2021 – 11 June 2021)
 Gonzalo García (16 June 2021 – present)

References

External links 

Official website 
Istra 1961 profile at UEFA.com
Istra 1961 profile at Sportnet.hr 

 
Football clubs in Croatia
Football clubs in Istria County
Association football clubs established in 1961
Sport in Pula